Riquelmo Alves Lima (born 19 March 2002), commonly known as Riquelmo, is a Brazilian footballer who currently plays as a forward for Fortaleza.

Career statistics

Club

Notes

References

2002 births
Living people
Brazilian footballers
Association football forwards
Campeonato Brasileiro Série B players
Cruzeiro Esporte Clube players